Albert t'Serstevens (born Brussels, Belgium; 1886-1974) was a Belgian novelist who settled in France in 1910. In 1937 he gained French nationality.

Works
 Un apostolat: roman, 1920
 La légende de Don Juan, 1924
 Taïa, roman contemporain, 1929
 (ed.) Voyages aux isles de l'Amérique (Antilles) 1693-1705 by Jean Baptiste Labat. 1931.
 (ed.) Le livre de Marco Polo; ou, Le devisement du monde'
Joie de plein air, editions pour la nouvelle France, 1944
 Tahiti et sa couronne, 1950–51
 La grande plantation: roman tahitien, 1952Cahiers de Louis Adhemar Timothée Le Golif, dit Borgnefesse, capitaine de la flibuste, 1952
 Mexique pays a trois étages, 1955. Translated as Mexico: three-storeyed land, 1957
 Les précurseurs de Marco Polo; textes intégraux établis, traduits, et commentés, 1959
 L'homme que fut Blaise Cendrars; souvenirs'', 1972

References

External links
Albert t'Serstevens, photographed by Emile Henri t'Serstevens on BALaT - Belgian Art Links and Tools (KIK-IRPA)

1886 births
1974 deaths
Belgian male novelists
20th-century Belgian novelists
20th-century Belgian male writers